Malloy is a surname of Irish origin, meaning "noble chief" (irish). (See also Molloy.) The name may refer to:

Dannel Malloy (born 1955), American politician, 88th Governor of Connecticut
Danny Malloy (footballer) (born 1930), former Scottish footballer
Dave Malloy (born 1976), American musical theater composer and playwright
David Malloy, American country music songwriter and producer
Doug Malloy, pseudonym of Richard Simonton, American business executive and body piercer
Duncan Malloy
Edward Malloy (born 1941), American priest, president of the University of Notre Dame 1987–2005
Fenster Malloy (born 1965), American Businessman; MBA University of Utah, President Rocky Mountain Research
Janine Malloy, character from the BBC soap opera EastEnders
Jim Malloy (1935–1972), American Indy 500 racecar driver
Jim Malloy (recording engineer) (1931–2018), American Grammy-winning recording engineer
Judy Malloy, American poet
Kady Malloy, contestant on the seventh season of American Idol
Larkin Malloy (1954–2016), American actor and model
The Malloys, American music video and film directors Emmett Malloy and Brendan Malloy
Michael Malloy (1873–1933), New York City vagrant; survived several attempts to murder him
Mike Malloy (contemporary), American radio broadcaster in Atlanta, Georgia
The Malloy Family, the sitcom Unhappily Ever After
Matt Malloy Mr. Basketball (2007), South Dakota
Ryan Malloy, character from the BBC soap opera EastEnders
 Terry Malloy, protagonist of On the Waterfront

"Tim Malloy" is sometimes used as a generic name for a Glasgow Catholic.

References

Anglicised Irish-language surnames